Robert Klein (November 11, 1848 – November 29, 1931) was a United States Navy sailor and a recipient of the United States military's highest decoration, the Medal of Honor.

Biography
Klein was born  November 11, 1848, in Gerdonen, Germany, and joined the U.S. Navy from Marseille, France. He served in the Spanish–American War of 1898. On that day, he rescued several shipmates who had been overcome by turpentine fumes in a double bottom compartment. For this action, he was awarded the Medal of Honor nine months later, on October 6, 1904.

Klein's official Medal of Honor citation reads:
Serving on board the U.S.S. Raleigh, for heroism in rescuing shipmates overcome in double bottoms by fumes of turpentine, 25 January 1904.

After his military service, Klein lived for several decades in Shanghai, China; he died there at age 83 on November 29, 1931.

See also

List of Medal of Honor recipients

References

1848 births
1931 deaths
German emigrants to China
United States Navy sailors
American military personnel of the Spanish–American War
American people of German descent
United States Navy Medal of Honor recipients
German-born Medal of Honor recipients
Non-combat recipients of the Medal of Honor